Guangdong Jiangmen No.1 Middle School(Simplified Chinese: 广东江门市第一中学; Traditional Chinese: 廣東江門市第一中學, commonly abbreviated as Jiangmen Yizhong or JMYZ) is a full-time and all boarding senior high school in Jianghai District, Jiangmen, Guangdong, China. Its earliest predecessor Jingxian Academy of Classical Learning was established during the Qing dynasty (1760) and expanded to a municipal high school in 1928. It is one of the most prestigious high schools in Five Counties in Guangdong now.



History 
 In 1760 (Qing dynasty), JMYZ's predecessor Jingxian Academy of Classical Learning was established by the local governor Zhou Zhirang.
 After the Xinhai Revolution (1911), Jingxian Academy was renamed as Jingxian Higher Primary School.
 In 1930, Jingxian Higher primary School was expanded to a municipal high school in Jiangmen.
 In 1931, it was renamed as Xinhui County No.2 Middle School, because Jiangmen City was changed into Jiangmen Town, governed by Xinhui County.
 After 1949, Xinhui County No.2 Middle School merged with Pengjiang Middle School and Mianxiang Middle School().
 In 1952, Xinhui County No.2 Middle School was renamed as Guangdong Jiangmen No.1 Middle School(JMYZ).
 In 1960, JMYZ was considered as one of the first batch of 16 key middle schools in Guangdong Province.
 In the 1990s, JMYZ was rated as one of the first batch of provincial first-class schools.
 In 2005, JMYZ was relocated to the present address (Jianghai District) by the Jiangmen Municipal Government.
 In 2006, JMYZ was awarded as one of the first batch of national model high schools.
 In 2007, JMYZ was be honored with the title of Senior High School with Excellent Teaching Quality in Guangdong.

Curriculum 
In Guangdong Jiangmen No.1 Middle School, there are mainly 3 types of curriculum for different senior high school students:
 General senior high school curriculum
 Generally speaking, it is set up for students who choose to take the National Higher Education Entrance Examination (NHEEE) when they are in senior year. In the first semester of the first year, these students should not only study 3 major subjects: Chinese, Math and English, but also social-science-oriented subjects (History, Geography, Politics) and natural-science-oriented subjects (Physics, Chemistry, Biology). In the second semester of the first year, they should make a choice to study social science or natural science in the last two year and a half, so they need to study 6 subjects for the NHEEE.
 Art Courses
 Set up for students who choose to take the Art College Entrance Examination, both major courses (Sketch) and academic courses are arranged for them. 
 International Education (ISS)
 Guangdong Jiangmen No.1 Middle School set up International curriculum experimental classes (国际课程实验班) in 2012, for high school students who nurse aspirations to study aboard. Instead of taking the National Higher Education Entrance Examination, they spend 3 years to prepare for High school level test, A-levels / SAT, and IELTS test, and then apply for overseas universities.

Facilities 
The new campus of JMYZ has been basically completed and fully operational in Sep 1st, 2005. With an area of near 58 acres, there are both learning equipment and living facilities providing for students, including a library, an art building, a science building, an administrative building, 6 teaching buildings, 9 dormitory buildings for both students and staffs, a three-storeyed canteen, a new gymnasium established in September 2012, 15 basketball courts, 14 badminton courts, 9 volleyball courts, 2 football pitches, a standard swimming pool, etc.

Faculty and staff 
There are totally 66 classes, more than 3600 students, 251 teachers in Jiangmen No.1 Middle School at present. Among 251 teachers,  5 of them have the title of 'Special-class Teacher', 129 of them are senior teachers and 83 of them first-grade teachers.

Achievements 

 In recent 10 years, JMYZ is the top high school in Five Counties in Guangdong with the largest number of students whose NHEEE scores above the local minimum mark for applying to key universities, and the percentage of entering undergraduate colleges is 98.5% in 2016.
 There are 5 provincial top scholars and more than 10 top scholars for single subjects in NHEEE so far, more than 40 students was admitted to Beijing University or Tsinghua University.
Since 2012, 100% of students from International curriculum experimental classes was admitted to the world's top 300 universities, 58% of them gained offers from world's top 100 universities.

Extracurricular life

Student Clubs 
There are 28 student clubs in Jiangmen No.1 Middle School at present, which are all managed by the Associations Union. Besides some conventional clubs, such as Student's Union, Television Station, Broadcasting Station and Literature Club, JMYZ also supports students to organize recreational groups, such as, Anime Club, Planetary Research Club, Taekwondo Club, Photography Club, etc. Furthermore, every year, there are some campus cultural activities organized by students, such as National Model United Nations (NMUN), The Talent Star Competition, 326 Association Party and so on.

Regular Activities

Sports Meeting 
It is held in October every year and it has been successfully held for 45 times up to 2016.

Red May Singing Contest 
It is a choirs contest taking class as a unit, being held on May every year.

New Year Party

One-Hundred-Day Oath-taking Ceremony and Adult Ceremony 
It is held at 100 days before the NHEEE to stimulate senior 3 students to study hard.

Anniversary Celebration 
Since 2010, large-scale activities are held in December every five years to celebrate the anniversary. Thousands of alumni are welcomed back to JMYZ.

Lights-out Ceremony 
It is spontaneously organized by students in May for senior 3 students who will take the coming NHEEE. To cheer up candidates, brief encouraging words was presented on the wall through utilizing the lights of dormitories orderly. There are different showing words in different year, but in the same format,  such as 2013 BIG WIN, 2014 HUG SKY, 2015 FLY HIGH, 2016 NON STOP.

Sister schools 
  United States California John W.North High School
    China Jiangmen Jingxian Middle School
    China Guangdong Fuquan Olympic School

External links 
 Guangdong Jiangmen No.1 Middle School Website

References 

1930 establishments in China
Jiangmen
High schools in Guangdong
Junior secondary schools in China